Fired Up is a vehicular combat game available on the PlayStation Portable. The game features a single-player campaign and a multiplayer mode which supports up to eight players. The game features demos of Wipeout Pure and MediEvil: Resurrection. Fired Up also features game sharing and downloadable content. It is derived from the 2002 PlayStation 2 online game Hardware: Online Arena.

Gameplay
Fired Ups Campaign mode is set in an unnamed eastern European country that has been invaded by a neighbouring country only known as "The Republic". The player takes on the role of five different characters fighting as mercenaries for a resistance army in several different vehicles and in four different locations.

The player can take on the subsequent missions, whenever they please, otherwise they can find yellow scavenge tokens which, for each 10 tokens collected, will unlock new secondary weapons, which the player can then use against AI enemies that spawn to attack the player. These weapons include grenades, heavy missiles, and laser. There are also turrets around the map for the player to use.

Also available are challenges, taking on the form of large trucks that roam the city. Upon destruction of one, the player must seek and eliminate the required number of enemies before the allocated time elapses. For every level of challenge complete, more, and better, health and armor pickups will spawn for the player to collect.

Multiplayer 
Fired Up features a multiplayer mode which supports up to eight players, through ad-hoc. The host can choose a variety of maps (some available as downloadable content), and game modes. Prior to the game starting, players can choose their preferred vehicle; the selection of vehicles includes resistance and republic vehicles from the Campaign mode.

Modes 
Deathmatch - Straight up vehicular brawl. Weapons vary on the map for which the players can use against their opponents. Also includes Team Deathmatch.
Team Capture the Flag - Players must grab the enemies' flag and return it to their base to score a point. Be wary as the enemy will do the same.
King of the Hill - A point is to be contested by all players. The winner is the one who has stayed in the hill the longest. Also includes Team King of the Hill.
Team Bomb the Base - Players must pick up explosives, spawning randomly across the map, and deliver them to the enemy's base. Ownership of bombs are carried over to players who kill enemy bomb carriers.
Assimilation - All players begin 'infected' but can find and pickup 'Antidote' pickups to cure them. The infected must then re-infect those by finding and either contact or kill. The last remaining player to be infected wins.
Race - The map is modified into a circuit and the first player to cross the finish line, is the winner. Along the way are items for the player to use, but they may either help or hinder the player in some way.

Other features 
The game also features game sharing that allows owners of the game UMD to provide a 'demo' version of the game to those who do not own a copy. Also included are two game demos, namely Wipeout Pure and MediEvil: Resurrection.

External links
Fired Up at GameSpot

2005 video games
Europe-exclusive video games
London Studio games
Multiplayer and single-player video games
PlayStation Portable games
PlayStation Portable-only games
Sony Interactive Entertainment games
Vehicular combat games
Video games developed in the United Kingdom
Video games scored by Alastair Lindsay
Video games set in Europe